Skeetrock is an unincorporated community in Dickenson County, Virginia, in the United States.

History
A post office was established at Skeetrock in 1901, and remained in operation until it was discontinued in 1958. Skeetrock was so named because locals would skate, or skeet, on the slippery creek bed.

References

Unincorporated communities in Dickenson County, Virginia
Unincorporated communities in Virginia